The 2010 Big 12 Conference softball tournament was held at ASA Hall of Fame Stadium in Oklahoma City, OK from May 15 through May 16, 2010. Oklahoma won their fourth conference tournament and earned the Big 12 Conference's automatic bid to the 2010 NCAA Division I softball tournament. 

Missouri would go on to play in the 2010 Women's College World Series.

After the 2010 season, the Big 12 would discontinue to the softball conference tournament. It would not return until 2017.

Standings
Source:

Schedule
Source:

All-Tournament Team
Source:

References

Big 12 Conference softball tournament
Tournament
Big 12 softball tournament